The Elected Member is a novel by Welsh writer Bernice Rubens. It won the Booker Prize for Fiction in 1970.

Plot
The novel's main character is Norman Zweck, who is addicted to amphetamines and is convinced that he sees silverfish wherever he goes.

Awards
The Elected Member won the 1970 Booker Prize. This made Rubens the first woman (and as of 2021, the only Welsh author) to win the prize.

References

Review of The Elected Member from the Booker Blog 'The Guardian'

Booker Prize-winning works
1969 British novels
Novels by Bernice Rubens
Eyre & Spottiswoode books